A studio Rubín is a historic building and theatre located at Malostranske Namesti. 262/9, 118 00  Praha Mala Strana in Prague in the Czech Republic. It is located in a late medieval building known as the "House of the Three Crowns", which was built around 1465 and since 1484 served as a hospital. It was later rebuilt in 1603 and from 1684 has served as a residential house. Today's appearance of the facade is from 1883.

References

External links
Official site
Timeline

Buildings and structures completed in 1465
Theatres in Prague